Chichester is a city in West Sussex, England.

Chichester may also refer to:

Places

United Kingdom 
 Chichester (district), a local government district in West Sussex
 Chichester, Tyne and Wear, an area of South Shields in North East England
 Chichester Park, an electoral ward of North Belfast, Northern Ireland
 Diocese of Chichester, a Church of England diocese
 Chichester (UK Parliament constituency)

Canada 
 Chichester, Quebec, a municipality in the Outaouais region

United States 
 Chichester, New Hampshire, a town
 Chichester, New York, a hamlet in the Catskill Mountains
 Chichester, Pennsylvania, formerly the port town of New Chichester and now divided into 4 municipalities including the separate townships of
 Upper Chichester Township, Delaware County, Pennsylvania
 Lower Chichester Township, Delaware County, Pennsylvania

Australia 
 Chichester River

People

Given name
 Chichester Bell (1848–1924), chemist, cousin to Alexander Graham Bell, and instrumental in developing improved versions of the phonograph
 Chichester Parkinson-Fortescue

Surname
 Arthur Chichester, 1st Baron Chichester (1563–1625), Lord Deputy of Ireland from 1604 to 1615
 Arthur Chichester, 1st Baron Templemore (1797–1837), Anglo-Irish soldier, politician, and courtier
 Lord Arthur Chichester (1808–1840), MP for Belfast
 Aston Chichester (1879–1962), first Roman Catholic Archbishop of Salisbury (now Harare, Zimbabwe)
 Christopher Chichester, an alleged alias of Christian Karl Gerhartsreiter (see Clark Rockefeller)
 D. G. Chichester (born 1964), American comic book writer
 Edward Chichester, 1st Viscount Chichester (1568–1648), Anglo-Irish nobleman
 Sir Francis Chichester (1901–1972), British round the world yachtsman
 Giles Chichester (born 1946), British Conservative Party politician, and was a Member of the European Parliament (MEP) for South West England and Gibraltar before retiring in 2014
 Guy Chichester (1935–2009), founding member of the Clamshell Alliance, an anti-nuclear group that led protests against Seabrook Station Nuclear Power Plant in the 1970s, which led to a broader environmental movement
 Happy Chichester, American singer-songwriter and multi-instrumentalist, living in Columbus, Ohio
 Henry Manners Chichester (1832–1894), British Army officer who after ten years active service overseas returned home and became an author
 James Chichester-Clark, Baron Moyola, former Prime Minister of Northern Ireland
 Lord John Chichester (1811–1873), MP for Belfast
 Sir John Chichester (d. 1569) (1520–1569), MP and High Sheriff of Devon
 Robert Chichester (disambiguation)
 Sir Robin Chichester-Clark (1928–2016), MP for Londonderry
 Rosanna Chichester (born 1991), beauty pageant titleholder who was crowned Miss British Virgin Islands 2013 and represented British Virgin Islands at Miss World 2014

By location
 Gervase of Chichester (died 1190s), English clergyman and writer active in the late 12th century
 Godfrey of Chichester (died 1088), medieval Bishop of Chichester
 Hilary of Chichester (died 1169), medieval Bishop of Chichester in England
 Richard of Chichester (1197–1253), who was Bishop of Chichester
 Robert of Chichester (died 1160), medieval Bishop of Exeter

Other
 Marquess of Donegall, a title held by the Chichester family
 Siege of Chichester, a victory by Parliamentarian forces led by Colonel William Waller over a small Royalist garrison
 Chichester College, a college of further education in Chichester, West Sussex
 Chichester Free School, a mixed free school located in Chichester, West Sussex, England
 Chichester House, a building in College Green (formerly Hoggen Green), Dublin, Ireland, used in the 17th century to house the Parliament of Ireland
 Chichester Psalms, a choral work by Leonard Bernstein for boy treble or countertenor, solo quartet, choir and orchestra (3 trumpets in B♭, 3 trombones, timpani, percussion [5 players], 2 harps, and strings)
 Chichester School District, a midsized, suburban public school district located in southeastern Delaware County, Pennsylvania
 Dean of Chichester, the dean of Chichester Cathedral in Sussex, England
 Peter of Chichester, the Dean of Wells during 1220
 Rape of Chichester, one of the rapes (traditional sub-divisions) of the historic county of Sussex in England
 Chichester Festival Theatre, a theatre in Chichester, England
 Chichesters, a former New York City gang

See also 
 
 Arthur Chichester (disambiguation)
 James Chichester (disambiguation)
 Edward Chichester (disambiguation)